The Egongyan Rail Transit Bridge is a suspension bridge carrying the Chongqing Rail Transit Loop line across the Yangtze. It connects Jiulongpo District in the west with Nan'an District in the east. The Egongyan Rail Transit Bridge is located about 70 meters upstream of the old Egongyan Bridge which carries only road traffic.

References 

Railway bridges in China